Punxsutawney Municipal Airport is a small regional non-towered airport located 3 miles North-East of Punxsutawney, Pennsylvania.

The airport has never had schedule airliner traffic throughout its history. It is designated by the Federal Aviation Administration as a low traffic regional non commercial airport. In 2014 the airport had a little over 11,000 aircraft operations. It is not unusual to see few or no aircraft arrivals or departures from the airport over the course of a day.

As designated by the FAA in 2015 the airport had 10 based aircraft, all fixed wing single engine airplanes. That same year the aircraft chart had 77% local general aviation, 19% transient general aviation and 4% military.

The airport was opened on October 4, 1929 at the time it was a single grass landing strip. Approximately 1,000 locals were in attendance when the airport was dedicated. In the late 70s or early 80s runway 6/24 was built the only asphalt runway at the airport.

See also
 List of airports in Pennsylvania

References 

Airports in Pennsylvania
Transportation buildings and structures in Jefferson County, Pennsylvania